"In the City" is a rock song written by Barry De Vorzon and Joe Walsh. It was first recorded by Walsh and released on the soundtrack for the 1979 film The Warriors. Another version of the song, recorded by Walsh's band the Eagles, was included on their album The Long Run, released the same year.

Background
The track was first recorded by guitarist Joe Walsh for the soundtrack to the 1979 movie The Warriors; the Eagles liked what they heard and decided to record it for their album The Long Run.

A video made for the track features a staged recording session: Joe Walsh plays a Gibson double neck guitar using the 12-string neck for the rhythm parts and the 6-string neck for the slide guitar parts; Timothy B. Schmit plays a Fender bass; Don Felder plays a Fender Stratocaster; Don Henley uses an 8-piece Ludwig drum kit with Paiste cymbals; Glenn Frey plays piano; and Joe Vitale plays congas.

Although not released as a single, the track became an album-oriented rock radio favorite in the U.S. and a Walsh concert staple. It is also featured on the Eagles' 1994 Hell Freezes Over album and video; in this version, the song ends with a slower version of the guitar hook from the Beatles' 1966 hit "Day Tripper".

In popular culture
The Eagles version of the song was used in The Simpsons episode "The Winter of His Content", in which Bart's plot is a parody of The Warriors, and in the Rick and Morty episode "The Ricklantis Mixup".

References

The Warriors (franchise)
Eagles (band) songs
Joe Walsh songs
1979 songs
Songs written by Joe Walsh
Song recordings produced by Bill Szymczyk
Songs written by Barry De Vorzon